The Delaware and Hudson Canal Museum is a museum in High Falls, New York, United States, specializing in the history and culture of the Delaware and Hudson Canal. It is located in the 1797 DePuy Tavern, D&H Canal Company Offices from 1850 to 1898. The building is a contributing property to the High Falls Historic District, listed on the National Register of Historic Places. The DePuy Tavern is also the site of the new Mid-Hudson Visitor Center, promoting over 100 attractions within a 35-mile radius of High Falls, NY. The museum's website, www.canalmuseum.org, links to their YouTube channel, D&H TV, with over 85 videos on this important American history, and has a map of all the publicly accessible extant D&H sites.

The museum includes approximately 4000 artifacts including maps, photographs, documents, models, paintings, and prints. It also maintains and operates a walking trail, the Five Locks Walk, which provides access to locks 16–20 of the former canal.

See also 
 List of maritime museums in the United States

References

External links 
 Museum homepage
 The virtual D & H Museum

Transportation museums in New York (state)
Museums in Ulster County, New York
Religious buildings and structures completed in 1885
Canal museums in the United States
Rosendale, New York